The 2014–15 Phoenix Suns season was the 47th season of the franchise in the NBA. It was also the last season that the arena was called the US Airways Center, before it was renamed Talking Stick Resort Arena beginning in October 2015. With Channing Frye and Leandro Barbosa leaving in free agency and Goran Dragić being traded to the Miami Heat near the end of the trade deadline, no other player on the team had made the playoffs with the organization in previous years now. The Suns were in playoff contention for much of the season but suffered in the final weeks, partly due to injuries involving Brandon Knight and later Alex Len, and partly due to the number of players added and taken away during the trade deadline. The Suns capped off the 2014–15 NBA season with five consecutive losses and losing 10 out of 11 games total (the worst season-ending stretch since its inaugural season), finishing third place in Pacific division and tenth place in Western Conference with a 39–43 record. The Suns did not qualify for the playoffs for the fifth straight year, which tied the stretch from the 1970–71 to 1974–75 seasons as the team's longest playoff drought.

What marked this season in particular were the trades the Suns made. In the offseason, the Suns traded for point guard Isaiah Thomas for 2013 second round pick Alex Oriakhi. Thomas was later traded in an infamously massive multi-team trade that also resulted in the Dragić brothers, rookie guard Tyler Ennis, and center Miles Plumlee going to some different teams in exchange for guard Brandon Knight from the Milwaukee Bucks, Marcus Thornton from the Boston Celtics, Danny Granger from the Miami Heat, and three different future first round picks (all of which were later used in different trades in future seasons). Before then, the Suns tried to remain competitive with smaller trades like trading Anthony Tolliver to the Detroit Pistons for Tony Mitchell (who was eventually waived), trading a future Minnesota Timberwolves first round pick (that was ultimately conveyed into two second-round selections) to Boston for center Brandan Wright, and being involved in a three-way trade with the Celtics and Los Angeles Clippers that gave them Reggie Bullock for Shavlik Randolph.

Key dates
May 20, 2014: The NBA Draft Lottery takes place.
June 26, 2014: The 2014 NBA draft takes place at the Barclays Center in Brooklyn, New York.
July 1, 2014: The NBA free agency period begins.
July 7, 2014: Channing Frye agrees to a 4-year, $32 million contract to play for the Orlando Magic, which signifies the completion of dismembering the last Suns playoff roster between 2010 and now (although Goran Dragić returned in 2012 after being traded a year earlier).
July 10, 2014: Teams can sign, trade, and amnesty players; P. J. Tucker agrees to a 3-year, $17.5 million contract to stay with the Suns.
July 11, 2014: The Suns complete a sign-and-trade, sending Alex Oriakhi and a $7 million trade exception to the Sacramento Kings in exchange for point guard Isaiah Thomas, who agrees to a 4-year, $27 million contract.
July 15, 2014: The Suns waive Ishmael "Ish" Smith's contract before it became guaranteed for the rest of the season.
July 16, 2014: Anthony Tolliver signs a 2-year, $6 million contract to play with the Suns.
July 28, 2014: P. J. Tucker is arrested for "super-extreme DUI."
August 8, 2014: Both first rounders T. J. Warren and Tyler Ennis sign.
August 12, 2014: The NBA suspend  P. J. Tucker was suspended for the first three games of the regular season.
August 13, 2014: The NBA accidentally leaks out that the Suns' Martin Luther King, Jr. Day game was to be played at home against the Los Angeles Lakers on TNT before the schedule is announced. After starting last season with only one ESPN game (with three more added during the regular season), the Suns get 17 nationally televised games, including 4 on ESPN and 6 on TNT (including a home game against the Oklahoma City Thunder and the regular season finale against the Los Angeles Clippers).
September 24, 2014: After months of inactivity, Eric Bledsoe agrees to a 5-year, $70 million contract.
September 25, 2014: The Suns partially buys out the contract of Zoran Dragić, Goran's brother, in order to sign him on a 2-year contract worth $4,012,500.
September 29, 2014: Media Day and training camp begins for the Suns; twin brothers Markieff and Marcus Morris receive 4-year contract extensions worth $32 million and $20 million, respectively.
October 29, 2014: The Suns play their first regular season game.
November 4, 2014: P. J. Tucker completes his three-game suspension.
November 19, 2014: The Suns played the Detroit Pistons at The Palace of Auburn Hills on the tenth anniversary of Malice at the Palace, winning 88–86.
December 2, 2014: The Suns announce the new name of the U.S. Airways Center, Talking Stick Resort Arena, which takes effect after the season.
December 24, 2014: The Suns trade Anthony Tolliver to the Detroit Pistons in exchange for power forward Tony Mitchell, who used to play basketball for North Texas University.
December 28, 2014: Following a six-game losing streak, the Suns start December with a six-game winning streak with wins over the Charlotte Hornets, New York Knicks, Washington Wizards, Dallas Mavericks, Sacramento Kings, and  Los Angeles Lakers, with all but the Dallas game on the road.
January 9, 2015: Prior to the Suns' close road loss against the rival San Antonio Spurs, the Suns traded with general manager Ryan McDonough's former team, the Boston Celtics, to grab the rights of power forward/center Brandan Wright in exchange for the Minnesota Timberwolves' top 12 protected first round pick the Suns first got from their Robin Lopez and Hakim Warrick for Wesley Johnson trade, which would be conveyed to two second round picks in 2016 and 2017 if the conditions aren't met by the end of the 2015–16 NBA season. The Suns also waived Tony Mitchell's rights in the process.
January 13, 2015: When the Suns had their 107–100 victory over the Cleveland Cavaliers, the Suns began their eight-game homestand for January, which marked the longest homestand in franchise history. This game also marked the Suns' halfway point into the regular season, which came by the Suns much faster than most of the teams in the NBA.
January 15, 2015: Before the Suns' upcoming home game against the Minnesota Timberwolves and a day after assigning Archie Goodwin to the Bakersfield Jam again, the Suns completed a three-way trade with the Los Angeles Clippers and the Boston Celtics. The Suns got second-year player Reggie Bullock from the Los Angeles Clippers, while the Boston Celtics took on Shavlik Randolph's cap space in order for the Clippers to have coach Doc Rivers' son Austin Rivers become a part of the same team again.
January 19, 2015: The Suns' home game against the Los Angeles Lakers was the first time in nearly two years that the Suns played a nationally televised game on TNT. Phoenix won in convincing fashion by 115–100 over the Lakers on that day, and they also completed their first season swept against the Lakers since the 2004–05 season. That game also provided the Suns' their 100th overall victory over the Lakers.
January 24, 2015: Markieff and Marcus Morris got involved in an assault case with a former mentor of theirs named Eric Hood.
January 30, 2015: After the Suns' 99–93 victory over the Chicago Bulls (which was Derrick Rose's first matchup against the Suns since 2011 and the Suns' first home victory over the Bulls since November 15, 2007), the Suns ended their longest homestand in team history with a 6–2 record.
February 13, 2015: The NBA All-Star Weekend break begins.
February 19, 2015: The NBA's trade deadline takes effect; the Suns completed a six-way trade with the Milwaukee Bucks, Miami Heat, New Orleans Pelicans, Philadelphia 76ers, and the Boston Celtics (again) by trading away both Zoran and Goran Dragić to the Heat, both Miles Plumlee and Tyler Ennis to the Bucks, Isaiah Thomas to the Celtics, and the Top-5 protected 2015 Los Angeles Lakers draft pick to the 76ers. In exchange, the Suns received star guard Brandon Knight (and Kendall Marshall) from the Bucks, Marcus Thornton from the Celtics, veteran small forward Danny Granger from the Heat, and John Salmons from the New Orleans Pelicans, as well as a 2016 first round pick from the Celtics via the Cleveland Cavaliers and two future first round draft picks from the Heat. This series of moves officially completed the transition period from the last time the Suns made it to the playoffs, as well as leaves only three current Suns players that were on the Suns during their second-worst season in team history. The Suns also waived both Kendall Marshall and John Salmons later that day.
February 20, 2015: The Suns signed former Suns center and training camp invitee Earl Barron to a 10-day contract.
March 3, 2015: The Suns signed center Earl Barron to a second 10-day contract.
March 10, 2015: The Suns signed guard Seth Curry, brother of Stephen Curry, to a 10-day contract for back-up purposes due to an injury that Brandon Knight got during the second home game against, funnily enough, the Golden State Warriors.
March 13, 2015: The Suns signed center Earl Barron for the rest of the season.
March 20, 2015: After completing his initial 10 day contract, Seth Curry was waived replaced by backup point guard A.J. Price with his own 10 day contract.
March 31, 2015: After completing his own 10 day contract, A.J. Price was waived from the team due to his poor performance.
April 1, 2015: The Suns signed guard Bakersfield Jam affiliate guard Jerel McNeal to a 10-day contract.
April 11, 2015: After completing his 10-day contract, the Suns decided to sign Jerel McNeal into the remainder of the 2015–16 NBA season.
April 17, 2015: Brandon Knight underwent arthroscopic surgery to take care of an anterior flap that was causing irritation to his injured ankle.
April 21, 2015: Markieff and Marcus Morris officially get felony assault charges on the same incident involving Eric Hood around January 2015.

Offseason

Draft picks

The Phoenix Suns had three first round picks and one second round pick this season. Their highest first round pick (the 14th pick) was their own that was also a part of the NBA draft lottery. Both of the extra draft picks the Suns had this season involved trades the Suns made last season. The 18th pick came from the Washington Wizards by the Suns trading Marcin Gortat, Kendall Marshall, Shannon Brown, and Malcolm Lee, with Phoenix also getting the rights of Emeka Okafor out of it. Their 27th pick, however, came from the Indiana Pacers due to the Suns trading power forward Luis Scola, with Phoenix also gaining Gerald Green and Miles Plumlee in the process. The lone second round pick they have is also the pick they had on their own accord due to their 48–34 record being one of the best in the NBA that past season. Before the draft came up, the Suns also had two other second round draft picks they had acquired from trades with the Los Angeles Lakers (Steve Nash for four draft picks and cash) and the Toronto Raptors (Sebastian Telfair for Hamed Haddadi and Toronto's second round pick) in the 2012–13 season (the last season Lance Blanks was the Suns' general manager). However, both of those second rounders went to the Milwaukee Bucks due to the former first being traded to the Minnesota Timberwolves in a three-way trade that had the Suns getting rid of Robin Lopez and Hakim Warrick for the New Orleans Hornets in exchange for taking on a one–year deal with Wesley Johnson and the possibility of having a future Timberwolves first round pick (which was eventually traded anyway) before being involved with Milwaukee in a later three-way trade with the Oklahoma City Thunder and the latter being involved with the Suns' own three-way trade with the Bucks and the Los Angeles Clippers in acquiring Eric Bledsoe (and Caron Butler) in exchange for Jared Dudley.

With the 14th pick, Phoenix selected T. J. Warren, a sophomore from North Carolina State University. Warren averaged  24.9 points and 7.1 rebounds per game, which earned him ACC Player of the Year and consensus second team All–American honors. The Suns also selected Canadian–born Tyler Ennis, a freshman from the Syracuse University with the 18th pick. Ennis averaged 12.9 points, 3.4 rebounds, 5.5 assists, and 2.1 steals in 35.7 minutes per game. Phoenix then selected the Serbian international prospect Bogdan Bogdanović of Partizan Belgrade as their 27th pick. Bogdanović averaged 14.8 points, 3.7 rebounds and assists, and 1.6 steals in 31.4 minutes per game for Partizan Belgrade, which helped him win the Euroleague's Rising Star award and the Basketball League of Serbia's Finals MVP award (as well as multiple international championships beforehand). Finally, with their 50th pick in the second round, the Suns decided to select Alec Brown, a senior from the University of Wisconsin–Green Bay. Brown averaged 15.3 points, 5.7 rebounds, and 3.1 blocks in his final season with the Phoenix, was named All–Horizon League first team, and won the Horizon League's Defensive Player of the Year award. He also co-led the Horizon League in career blocks with 309 total blocks, scored 1,678 points and grabbed 800 rebounds during his time in Green Bay.

Free agency

Veteran players Emeka Okafor and Leandro Barbosa, as well as the newly signed Shavlik Randolph, Ishmael "Ish" Smith, and Dionte Christmas all became unrestricted free agents as of the end of the 2013–14 NBA season. In addition, both co-star point guard Eric Bledsoe and P. J. Tucker ended up being restricted free agents as well. Not only that, but on June 22, 2014, Channing Frye decided to decline his final year of his contract he had earlier on with the team and decided to pursue free agency as well. On July 7, 2014, Frye ended up signing a 4-year, $32 million contract to play for the Orlando Magic. During the July Moratorium (July 10), the Suns re–signed P. J. Tucker to a three–year contract worth $16.5 million. Ish Smith became a free agent on July 15, 2014 during the deadline for teams to decide on whether they want to make Smith's, Randolph's, and Christmas' non-guaranteed contracts become fully guaranteed this season; Smith signed with the Houston Rockets three days later. Meanwhile, Shavlik Randolph's $1.23 million contract became guaranteed on July 17. A week later, Dionte Christmas was waived from the team. Leandro Barbosa left to sign a one-year veteran's minimum contract with the Golden State Warriors on August 28, 2014. On September 10, 2014, Dionte Christmas joined the New Orleans Pelicans. The only player to have not been signed at all was Emeka Okafor due to his injury problems and was originally planning to fully recover sometime around the 2015–16 NBA season. However, Okafor was out for four whole seasons (including the only one he was technically considered a part of the Suns) before signing a new training camp deal to play for a newly reformed Philadelphia 76ers squad on September 23, 2017 (although being waived by them on October 14 the same year before the regular season began, with the intent of playing for the Delaware 87ers that same year soon afterward before signing with the New Orleans Pelicans for the rest of the 2017–18 season, starting on February 3, 2018).

After trying to woo the likes of LeBron James, Carmelo Anthony, and even Chris Bosh to sign with the Suns, they ended up pursuing the likes of different free agents that were going under the radar at the time. For starters, a day after the Suns got P. J. Tucker to agree with a new deal for the Suns, the Sacramento Kings' point guard Isaiah Thomas ended up agreeing to a four-year contract worth $27 million. However, to ensure the Suns got Thomas, they agreed to trade last season's second round pick Alex Oriakhi and a traded player exception worth $7 million in order to make sure the Kings didn't match their offer since Thomas was still a restricted free agent at the time. On July 16, 2014, the Suns signed power forward Anthony Tolliver, who had played for the Charlotte Bobcats back when they were named that before they became the new Charlotte Hornets, a two-year contract worth $6 million, with his second year only having $400,000 guaranteed with his contract. After the 2014 FIBA World Championship ended for Goran Dragić's team in Slovenia, the Suns planned on getting his brother Zoran Dragić on a contract buyout from Unicaja Málaga in Spain on September 12, 2014. The planned buyout involves the Suns paying $600,000 for the $1,100,000 required by the team, while Goran helped pay his brother the rest that was required for his buyout. The transaction was completed on September 24, 2014; he signed a two-year contract worth $4,012,500. Finally, after months of inactivity and even a trade rumor relating to the Minnesota Timberwolves, the Suns and Eric Bledsoe met over a new contract on September 23, 2014 finally agreeing to a five-year contract worth $70 million a day later. The new contract was the biggest since 2006 with Boris Diaw's 5-year, $45 million deal. Six days later, the Suns extended the contracts of Markieff and Marcus Morris to 4 year contracts worth $32 million and $20 million respectively.

On August 26, 2014, the Suns decided to sign both former Suns player Earl Barron (who last played for the New York Knicks) and the undrafted Casey Prather from the Florida Gators to non-guaranteed contracts for training camp. After that, the Suns signed the undrafted Joe Jackson from the Memphis Tigers under that same sort of deal. The Suns also signed Jamil Wilson of the Marquette Golden Eagles in September as well. However, the Suns waived Wilson, Jackson, and Prather from the team on October 14, 2014, while Barron was waived on October 25, 2014 after battling Shavlik Randolph (and Anthony Tolliver) for the final roster spot; everyone that was waived after the pre-season played in the affiliate Bakersfield Jam soon afterwards. However, Barron signed with the Suns again on February 20, 2015 well, after both Shavlik and Anthony left the team in different trades. This time, in his second stint with the Suns, they first gave him a 10-day contract. After succeeding in his initial test with limited playing time, the Suns gave him a second 10-day contract on March 3, 2015 before keeping him for the rest of the season on March 13, 2015. Around the time Earl was playing in his second 10-day contract, the Suns signed Stephen Curry's brother Seth Curry to a 10-day contract on March 10, 2015 after an injury Brandon Knight got against the Golden State Warriors a day earlier. After completing his 10-day contract, Seth was waived and replaced with back-up point guard A.J. Price on March 20, 2015 instead. When he failed under his 10-day stint as a player, he was waived on March 31, 2015 and replaced by affiliate Bakersfield Jam player (and eventual D-League Impact Player of the Year winner) Jerel McNeal a day later. Finally, after he finished his own 10-day contract, the Suns decided to sign Jerel into the 2015–16 season (so long as he'd meet team options by July 21, 2015, which was after the team's Summer League stint ended) on April 11, 2015.

Trades
During Christmas Eve, the Suns traded Anthony Tolliver to the Detroit Pistons in exchange for the rights to Tony Mitchell from North Texas University. Mitchell never played for the Suns, though, and on January 9, 2015, the Suns traded the conditional Minnesota Timberwolves first round draft pick to the Boston Celtics in exchange for power forward/center Brandan Wright hours before their road game against the San Antonio Spurs began. That prompted the Suns to waive their rights to Tony Mitchell before they became guaranteed for the Suns. Nearly a week later, the Suns took part in another trade with the Celtics, this time being part of a three-way deal with the Los Angeles Clippers. In that deal, the Suns grabbed Reggie Bullock from the Clippers while the Celtics took on Shavlik Randolph's salary (as well as Chris Douglas–Roberts and a future second round pick) in order for Doc Rivers' son Austin Rivers to play for the Clippers and be reunited in the process. Finally, during the trade deadline on February 19, 2015, after announcements of Goran Dragić displaying his major displeasure with the team as it was and wanting to be traded to a specific list of teams (those teams being either the rival Los Angeles Lakers, the New York Knicks with Carmelo Anthony, or the Miami Heat with Dwyane Wade and Chris Bosh), the Suns engaged in the equivalent of a seven-way trade that involved the likes of the Boston Celtics (once more), as well as the Miami Heat, the Milwaukee Bucks, the New Orleans Pelicans, the Philadelphia 76ers, and the Detroit Pistons (the only team Phoenix did not directly make a move with that day).

In the first trade the Suns did on the trade deadline, the Suns traded away the Dragić brothers in guards Goran and Zoran Dragić to the Miami Heat, while the Suns received veteran former-All-Star small forward Danny Granger and two different first round picks from the Heat (one that was originally protected in 2017 until the Ted Stepien Rule changed it to 2018, with it still remaining protected until 2019 (the latest that Phoenix can receive their first selection as a completely unprotected first round pick instead of having a top-7 protection at hand) and another that is completely unprotected in 2021), as well as veteran swingman John Salmons from the Pelicans, while New Orleans received two-time champion guard Norris Cole, power forward Shawne Williams, center Justin Hamilton, and cash considerations, which all came from the Heat. With their second trade, the Suns received guard Marcus Thornton (on an expiring contract) and a 2016 first round draft pick (that'll be from the eventual NBA Finals champion Cleveland Cavaliers) from the Celtics in exchange for their biggest off-season signing in point guard Isaiah Thomas, with Boston also acquiring power forward Jonas Jerebko and guard Luigi Datome from the Pistons in exchange for the return of champion player Tayshaun Prince. Finally, in what was perceived at the time to be the trade the Suns got the biggest value out of other teams, the Suns traded away both rookie point guard Tyler Ennis and downgraded center Miles Plumlee to the Milwaukee Bucks and the projected 2015 Los Angeles Lakers' top 5 protected first round draft pick that was ultimately conveyed by 2018 to the Philadelphia 76ers (in which Philadelphia gave up Rookie of The Year winning guard Michael Carter-Williams to the Bucks as well) in exchange for point guard Brandon Knight and injured former Suns point guard Kendall Marshall. Phoenix waived both John Salmons and Kendall Marshall later that day. Marshall joined the Philadelphia 76ers after this season ended, while Salmons still had before unofficially announcing his NBA retirement on September 23, 2018.

Roster

Salaries

Because of a few past transactions made from Lance Blanks' tenure that didn't pan out so well for the Suns, Josh Childress was still owed $7,317,500 due to them amnestying his contract two seasons ago, while under the Michael Beasley buyout the Suns did on September 3, 2013, they owed Beasley the equivalent of $2,333,333 for the next three seasons as opposed to giving him the guaranteed amount of $3,000,000 he was owed in his original contract. While Josh Childress' salary did not affect the Suns' overall salary cap to their season that year (and was the last time Phoenix owed money to him, especially considering Childress went to the Sydney Kings in Australia this season), Michael Beasley's contract still affected the Suns' salary despite Beasley going to the Shanghai Sharks in China that season as well before returning to the Miami Heat later on in the season, but only for a few thousand dollars (around $777,778) instead of a few million. In addition, the Suns also bought out the short, small contracts of North Texas University power forward Tony Mitchell, former Suns point guard Kendall Marshall, and John Salmons after finishing their respective deals with the Detroit Pistons, Milwaukee Bucks, and New Orleans Pelicans.

Pre-season

|- style="background:#cfc;"
| 1 
| October 8
| Flamengo
| 
| Isaiah Thomas (18)
| Marcus Morris (7)
| Isaiah Thomas (4)
| US Airways Center8,041
| 1–0
|- style="background:#cfc;"
| 2 
| October 10
| Denver
| 
| Goran Dragić, Markieff Morris (12)
| P. J. Tucker (10)
| Isaiah Thomas (6)
| US Airways Center11,734
| 2–0
|- style="background:#fcc;"
| 3 
| October 13
| @ Houston
| 
| Eric Bledsoe (13)
| Earl Barron (13)
| Isaiah Thomas (6)
| Toyota Center14,642
| 2–1
|- style="background:#cfc;"
| 4 
| October 16
| San Antonio
| 
| Goran Dragić (20)
| Markieff Morris (7)
| Goran Dragić, Eric Bledsoe (6)
| US Airways Center13,552
| 3–1
|- style="background:#cfc;"
| 5 
| October 21
| @ L.A. Lakers
| 
| Isaiah Thomas (26)
| P. J. Tucker (8)
| Eric Bledsoe (6)
| Honda Center (Anaheim)8,037
| 4–1
|- style="background:#fcc;"
| 6 
| October 22
| @ L.A. Clippers
| 
| Eric Bledsoe (27)
| Miles Plumlee, Marcus Morris, P. J. Tucker (8)
| Goran Dragić, Isaiah Thomas (4)
| Staples Center13,477
| 4–2
|- style="background:#cfc;"
| 7 
| October 24
| @ Utah
| 
| Goran Dragić, Isaiah Thomas (18)
| Markieff Morris, Olexsiy "Alex" Len (6)
| Eric Bledsoe (5)
| EnergySolutions Arena18,087
| 5–2

Regular season

Standings

Game log

|- style="background:#cfc;"
| 1
| October 29
| L.A. Lakers
| 
| Isaiah Thomas (23)
| Miles Plumlee, Eric Bledsoe, Anthony Tolliver (6)
| Eric Bledsoe (9)
| US Airways Center17,523
| 1–0
|- style="background:#cfc;"
| 2
| October 31
| San Antonio
| 
| Isaiah Thomas (23)
| Markieff Morris, Oleksiy "Alex" Len (11)
| Isaiah Thomas (4)
| US Airways Center15,050
| 2–0

|- style="background:#fcc;"
| 3
| November 1
| @ Utah
| 
| Gerald Green (16)
| Markieff Morris (7)
| Eric Bledsoe (8)
| EnergySolutions Arena17,721
| 2–1
|- style="background:#cfc;"
| 4
| November 4
| @ L.A. Lakers
| 
| Gerald Green (26)
| Markieff Morris (10)
| Isaiah Thomas (9)
| Staples Center18,997
| 3–1
|- style="background:#fcc;"
| 5
| November 5
| Memphis
| 
| Eric Bledsoe (23)
| P. J. Tucker (11)
| Eric Bledsoe (4)
| US Airways Center15,377
| 3–2
|- style="background:#fcc;"
| 6
| November 7
| Sacramento
| 
| Eric Bledsoe (23)
| Miles Plumlee (16)
| Eric Bledsoe (8)
| US Airways Center15,476
| 3–3
|- style="background:#cfc;"
| 7
| November 9
| Golden State
| 
| Isaiah Thomas (22)
| Marcus Morris (9)
| Isaiah Thomas (7)
| US Airways Center16,046
| 4–3
|- style="background:#cfc;"
| 8
| November 12
| Brooklyn
| 
| Gerald Green (28)
| Miles Plumlee (10)
| Goran Dragić (6)
| US Airways Center15,184
| 5–3
|- style="background:#fcc;"
| 9
| November 14
| Charlotte
| 
| Eric Bledsoe (22) 
| Eric Bledsoe (11)
| Eric Bledsoe (5)
| US Airways Center16,291
| 5–4
|- style="background:#fcc;"
| 10
| November 15
| @ L.A. Clippers
| 
| Gerald Green (26)
| Oleksiy "Alex" Len (11)
| Eric Bledsoe (10)
| Staples Center19,060
| 5–5
|- style="background:#cfc"
| 11
| November 17
| @ Boston
| 
| Markieff Morris (30)
| Markieff Morris, Oleksiy "Alex" Len (7)
| Marcus Morris, Goran Dragić, Eric Bledsoe (7)
| TD Garden16,726
| 6–5
|- style="background:#cfc"
| 12
| November 19
| @ Detroit
| 
| Eric Bledsoe (18)
| Miles Plumlee (10)
| Eric Bledsoe, Goran Dragić, Gerald Green (4)
| Palace of Auburn Hills10,686
| 7–5
|- style="background:#cfc"
| 13
| November 21
| @ Philadelphia
| 
| Isaiah Thomas (23)
| P. J. Tucker (8)
| Isaiah Thomas (8)
| Wells Fargo Center16,789
| 8–5
|- style="background:#cfc"
| 14
| November 22
| @ Indiana
| 
| Gerald Green (23)
| Eric Bledsoe (9)
| Eric Bledsoe (5)
| Bankers Life Fieldhouse16,870
| 9–5
|- style="background:#fcc"
| 15
| November 24
| @ Toronto
| 
| Eric Bledsoe (25)
| Markieff Morris, P. J. Tucker (8)
| Eric Bledsoe (6)
| Air Canada Centre19,800
| 9–6
|- style="background:#cfc"
| 16
| November 26
| Denver
| 
| Gerald Green (24)
| Markieff Morris (10)
| Eric Bledsoe (10)
| US Airways Center16,099
| 10–6
|- style="background:#fcc"
| 17
| November 28
| @ Denver
| 
| Eric Bledsoe (16)
| Oleksiy "Alex" Len (8)
| Eric Bledsoe (4)
| Pepsi Center15,509
| 10–7
|- style="background:#fcc"
| 18
| November 30
| Orlando
| 
| Goran Dragić (22)
| Markieff Morris (7)
| Markieff Morris (10)
| US Airways Center15,558
| 10–8

|- style="background:#cfc"
| 19
| December 2
| Indiana
| 
| Goran Dragić (34)
| Miles Plumlee, P. J. Tucker (7)
| Eric Bledsoe (7)
| US Airways Center15,059
| 11–8
|- style="background:#cfc"
| 20
| December 5
| @ Dallas
| 
| Goran Dragić (28)
| Markieff Morris (10)
| Goran Dragić (13)
| American Airlines Center20,010
| 12–8
|- style="background:#fcc"
| 21
| December 6
| @ Houston
| 
| Eric Bledsoe (23)
| P. J. Tucker (8)
| Goran Dragić (6)
| Toyota Center18,060
| 12–9
|- style="background:#fcc"
| 22
| December 8
| @ L.A. Clippers
| 
| Eric Bledsoe (27)
| Eric Bledsoe (11)
| Eric Bledsoe (16)
| Staples Center19,060
| 12–10
|- style="background:#fcc"
| 23
| December 9
| Miami
| 
| Marcus Morris (25)
| Miles Plumlee, Eric Bledsoe, Marcus Morris (5)
| Eric Bledsoe (8)
| US Airways Center14,963
| 12–11
|- style="background:#fcc"
| 24
| December 12
| Detroit
| 
| Goran Dragić (18)
| P. J. Tucker (9)
| Goran Dragić (5)
| US Airways Center17,007
| 12–12
|- style="background:#fcc"
| 25
| December 14
| @ Oklahoma City
| 
| Gerald Green (15)
| Miles Plumlee, Gerald Green (7)
| Eric Bledsoe, Isaiah Thomas (4)
| Chesapeake Energy Arena18,203
| 12–13
|- style="background:#fcc"
| 26
| December 15
| Milwaukee
| 
| Markieff Morris (25)
| Gerald Green (8)
| P. J. Tucker, Eric Bledsoe (4)
| US Airways Center17,327
| 12–14
|- style="background:#cfc"
| 27
| December 17
| @ Charlotte
| 
| Isaiah Thomas (23)
| Markieff Morris (8)
| Goran Dragić (8)
| Time Warner Cable Arena15,459
| 13–14
|- style="background:#cfc"
| 28
| December 20
| @ New York
| 
| Eric Bledsoe (25)
| Eric Bledsoe (10)
| Eric Bledsoe, Isaiah Thomas, Gerald Green, P. J. Tucker (3)
| Madison Square Garden19,812
| 14–14
|- style="background:#cfc"
| 29
| December 21
| @ Washington
| 
| Eric Bledsoe, Markieff Morris (17)
| Eric Bledsoe (9)
| Goran Dragić (4)
| Verizon Center18,207
| 15–14
|- style="background:#cfc"
| 30
| December 23
| Dallas
| 
| Goran Dragić (25)
| Eric Bledsoe (10)
| Eric Bledsoe (11)
| US Airways Center18,055
| 16–14
|- style="background:#cfc"
| 31
| December 26
| @ Sacramento
| 
| Marcus Morris (20)
| Oleksiy "Alex" Len (11)
| Eric Bledsoe, Goran Dragić (6)
| Sleep Train Arena17,317
| 17–14
|- style="background:#cfc"
| 32
| December 28
| @ L.A. Lakers
| 
| Goran Dragić (24)
| Eric Bledsoe, Oleksiy "Alex" Len (8)
| Eric Bledsoe (8)
| Staples Center18,997
| 18–14
|- style="background:#fcc"
| 33
| December 30
| @ New Orleans
| 
| Goran Dragić (22)
| Eric Bledsoe (8)
| Eric Bledsoe, Goran Dragić, Isaiah Thomas (3)
| Smoothie King Center16,364
| 18–15
|- style="background:#fcc"
| 34
| December 31
| @ Oklahoma City
| 
| Eric Bledsoe (29)
| Goran Dragić (8)
| Eric Bledsoe (8)
| Chesapeake Energy Arena18,203
| 18–16

|- style="background:#cfc"
| 35
| January 2
| Philadelphia
| 
| Gerald Green, Markieff Morris (21)
| Goran Dragić (10)
| Eric Bledsoe (8)
| US Airways Center16,514
| 19–16
|- style="background:#cfc"
| 36
| January 4
| Toronto
| 
| Eric Bledsoe (20)
| Miles Plumlee (7)
| Eric Bledsoe (8)
| US Airways Center17,166
| 20–16
|- style="background:#cfc"
| 37
| January 6
| @ Milwaukee
| 
| Markieff Morris (26)
| Markieff Morris (10)
| Eric Bledsoe (10)
| BMO Harris Bradley Center12,311
| 21–16
|- style="background:#cfc"
| 38
| January 7
| @ Minnesota
| 
| Goran Dragić (25)
| P. J. Tucker (9)
| Goran Dragić (4)
| Target Center10,547
| 22–16
|- style="background:#fcc"
| 39
| January 9
| @ San Antonio
| 
| Eric Bledsoe, P. J. Tucker (19)
| Oleksiy "Alex" Len (12)
| Eric Bledsoe (10)
| AT&T Center18,581
| 22–17
|- style="background:#fcc"
| 40
| January 11
| @ Memphis
| 
| Isaiah Thomas (20)
| Oleksiy "Alex" Len (13)
| Eric Bledsoe (5)
| FedExForum17,212
| 22–18
|- style="background:#cfc"
| 41
| January 13
| Cleveland
| 
| Markieff Morris (35)
| Oleksiy "Alex" Len (10)
| Eric Bledsoe (6)
| US Airways Center16,819
| 23–18
|- style="background:#cfc"
| 42
| January 16
| Minnesota
| 
| Goran Dragić (21)
| Oleksiy "Alex" Len (12)
| Goran Dragić (8)
| US Airways Center17,441
| 24–18
|- style="background:#cfc"
| 43
| January 19
| L.A. Lakers
| 
| Goran Dragić, Isaiah Thomas (24)
| Goran Dragić (9)
| Eric Bledsoe (7)
| US Airways Center17,435
| 25–18
|- style="background:#cfc"
| 44
| January 21
| Portland
| 
| Eric Bledsoe (33)
| P. J. Tucker (13)
| Eric Bledsoe (6)
| US Airways Center16,703
| 26–18
|- style="background:#fcc"
| 45
| January 23
| Houston
| 
| Eric Bledsoe (25)
| Oleksiy "Alex" Len (11)
| Eric Bledsoe (9)
| US Airways Center16,701
| 26–19
|- style="background:#fcc"
| 46
| January 25
| L.A. Clippers
| 
| Isaiah Thomas (25)
| Miles Plumlee (7)
| Goran Dragić (8)
| US Airways Center17,066
| 26–20
|- style="background:#cfc"
| 47
| January 28
| Washington
| 
| Goran Dragić (20)
| P. J. Tucker (10)
| Eric Bledsoe (6)
| US Airways Center16,209
| 27–20
|- style="background:#cfc"
| 48
| January 30
| Chicago
| 
| Eric Bledsoe (23)
| Markieff Morris (14)
| Eric Bledsoe (6)
| US Airways Center18,055
| 28–20
|- style="background:#fcc"
| 49
| January 31
| @ Golden State
| 
| Markieff Morris (17)
| Markieff Morris (11)
| Isaiah Thomas (5)
| Oracle Arena19,596
| 28–21

|- style="background:#fcc"
| 50
| February 2
| Memphis
| 
| Isaiah Thomas (24)
| Oleksiy "Alex" Len, Eric Bledsoe (7)
| Eric Bledsoe (7)
| US Airways Center17,199
| 28–22
|- style="background:#fcc"
| 51
| February 5
| @ Portland
| 
| Markieff Morris (18)
| Markieff Morris (8) 
| Goran Dragić (5)
| Moda Center19,488
| 28–23
|- style="background:#cfc"
| 52
| February 6
| Utah
| 
| Marcus Morris (34)
| Marcus Morris (12)
| Eric Bledsoe, Goran Dragić (6)
| US Airways Center18,055
| 29–23
|- style="background:#fcc"
| 53
| February 8
| @ Sacramento
| 
| Isaiah Thomas (26)
| Miles Plumlee (12)
| Isaiah Thomas, Goran Dragić (5)
| Sleep Train Arena17,013
| 29–24
|- style="background:#fcc"
| 54
| February 10
| Houston
| 
| Eric Bledsoe (32)
| P. J. Tucker, Miles Plumlee (7)
| Isaiah Thomas (6)
| US Airways Center17,071
| 29–25
|- align="center"
|colspan="9" bgcolor="#bbcaff"|All-Star Break
|- style="background:#fcc"
| 55
| February 20
| @ Minnesota
| 
| Markieff Morris (31)
| Oleksiy "Alex" Len (10)
| Eric Bledsoe, Gerald Green (6)
| Target Center14,077
| 29–26
|- style="background:#fcc"
| 56
| February 21
| @ Chicago
| 
| P. J. Tucker (20)
| Oleksiy "Alex" Len (11)
| Eric Bledsoe (8) 
| United Center22,292
| 29–27
|- style="background:#fcc"
| 57
| February 23
| Boston
| 
| Eric Bledsoe (21) 
| Oleksiy "Alex" Len, P. J. Tucker (12)
| Eric Bledsoe (10) 
| US Airways Center17,076
| 29–28
|- style="background:#cfc"
| 58
| February 25
| @ Denver
| 
| Brandon Knight (19)
| Oleksiy "Alex" Len (10)
| Eric Bledsoe, Brandon Knight (6)
| Pepsi Center12,813
| 30–28
|- style="background:#cfc"
| 59
| February 26
| Oklahoma City
| 
| Markieff Morris (29)
| Eric Bledsoe (13) 
| Eric Bledsoe (9) 
| US Airways Center17,514
| 31–28
|- style="background:#fcc"
| 60
| February 28
| San Antonio
| 
| Marcus Morris (19)
| P. J. Tucker (11)
| Markieff Morris, Archie Goodwin (3)
| US Airways Center18,055
| 31–29

|- style="background:#fcc"
| 61
| March 2
| @ Miami
| 
| Eric Bledsoe, P. J. Tucker (20)
| P. J. Tucker (14)
| Brandon Knight (7)
| American Airlines Arena19,600
| 31–30
|- style="background:#cfc"
| 62
| March 4
| @ Orlando
| 
| Brandon Knight (28)
| Eric Bledsoe (7)
| Eric Bledsoe (9)
| Amway Center15,822
| 32–30
|- style="background:#cfc"
| 63
| March 6
| @ Brooklyn
| 
| Eric Bledsoe, Marcus Morris, Markieff Morris (19)
| Eric Bledsoe (10)
| Brandon Knight (7)
| Barclays Center16,445
| 33–30
|- style="background:#fcc"
| 64
| March 7
| @ Cleveland
| 
| Markieff Morris (16)
| P. J. Tucker (9)
| Eric Bledsoe (9)
| Quicken Loans Arena20,562
| 33–31
|- style="background:#fcc"
| 65
| March 9
| Golden State
| 
| Eric Bledsoe (19)
| Oleksiy "Alex" Len (11)
| Eric Bledsoe, Markieff Morris (3)
| US Airways Center18,055
| 33–32
|- style="background:#cfc"
| 66
| March 11
| Minnesota
| 
| Markieff Morris (24)
| Marcus Morris, Brandan Wright (9)
| Eric Bledsoe (9)
| US Airways Center17,367
| 34–32
|- style="background:#fcc"
| 67
| March 13
| Atlanta
| 
| Markieff Morris (22)
| P. J. Tucker (9)
| Eric Bledsoe (6) 
| US Airways Center17,136
| 34–33
|- style="background:#cfc"
| 68
| March 15
| New York
| 
| Eric Bledsoe (21) 
| Brandan Wright (11)
| Eric Bledsoe (11) 
| US Airways Center17,264
| 35–33
|- style="background:#cfc"
| 69
| March 19
| New Orleans
| 
| Markieff Morris (17)
| Marcus Morris (13)
| Marcus Morris (4)
| US Airways Center18,055
| 36–33
|- style="background:#cfc"
| 70
| March 21
| @ Houston
| 
| Eric Bledsoe (34)
| Marcus Morris (10)
| Markieff Morris (6)
| Toyota Center18,340
| 37–33
|- style="background:#cfc"
| 71
| March 22
| Dallas
| 
| Eric Bledsoe (20)
| Markieff Morris (13)
| Eric Bledsoe (9)
| US Airways Center17,435
| 38–33
|- style="background:#fcc"
| 72
| March 25
| Sacramento
| 
| Markieff Morris (24)
| P. J. Tucker (11)
| Markieff Morris, P. J. Tucker (4)
| US Airways Center17,589
| 38–34
|- style="background:#fcc"
| 73
| March 27
| Portland
| 
| Marcus Morris (19)
| Marcus Morris (12)
| Eric Bledsoe (7)
| US Airways Center17,219
| 38–35
|- style="background:#fcc"
| 74
| March 29
| Oklahoma City
| 
| Markieff Morris (24)
| Oleksiy "Alex" Len (11)
| Eric Bledsoe (7) 
| US Airways Center17,538
| 38–36
|- style="background:#fcc"
| 75
| March 30
| @ Portland
| 
| Gerald Green, T. J. Warren (13)
| P. J. Tucker (11)
| Eric Bledsoe (7) 
| Moda Center19,441
| 38–37

|- style="background:#fcc"
| 76
| April 2
| @ Golden State
| 
| Eric Bledsoe (18)
| Markieff Morris, Brandan Wright (12)
| Eric Bledsoe (11) 
| Oracle Arena19,596
| 38–38
|- style="background:#cfc"
| 77
| April 4
| Utah
| 
| Gerald Green (24)
| P. J. Tucker (9)
| Eric Bledsoe (5)
| US Airways Center18,055
| 39–38
|- style="background:#fcc"
| 78
| April 7
| @ Atlanta
| 
| Gerald Green (15)
| Markieff Morris, Brandan Wright (6)
| Eric Bledsoe, Markieff Morris (5)
| Philips Arena18,650
| 39–39
|- style="background:#fcc"
| 79
| April 8
| @ Dallas
| 
| Gerald Green (30)
| Marcus Morris (10)
| Markieff Morris (7)
| American Airlines Center20,262
| 39–40
|- style="background:#fcc"
| 80
| April 10
| @ New Orleans
| 
| Eric Bledsoe (19)
| Markieff Morris (11)
| Eric Bledsoe (7)
| Smoothie King Center17,954
| 39–41
|- style="background:#fcc"
| 81
| April 12
| @ San Antonio
| 
| Gerald Green (23)
| Marcus Morris, P. J. Tucker (8)
| Eric Bledsoe (10) 
| AT&T Center18,581
| 39–42
|- style="background:#fcc"
| 82
| April 14
| L.A. Clippers
| 
| Archie Goodwin (18)
| Markieff Morris, P. J. Tucker (8)
| Eric Bledsoe (9) 
| US Airways Center18,055
| 39–43

Player statistics

|- align="center" bgcolor=""
|  || 16 || 1 || 8.9 || .308 || .500 || .500 || 1.8 || 0.3 || .3 || .1 || 2.0
|- align="center" bgcolor="#f0f0f0"
|  || 81 || 81 || style="background:#FF8800;color:#523189;"| 34.6 || .447 || .324 || .800 || 5.2 || style="background:#FF8800;color:#523189;"| 6.1 || style="background:#FF8800;color:#523189;"| 1.6 || .6 || style="background:#FF8800;color:#523189;"| 17.0
|- align="center" bgcolor=""
| * || 11 || 0 || 6.8 || .063 || .000 || .500 || 0.9 || 0.2 || .1 || .2 || 0.4
|- align="center" bgcolor="#f0f0f0"
|  || 2 || 0 || 4.0 || .000 || .000 || . || 1.0 || 0.5 || .0 || .0 || 0.0
|- align="center" bgcolor=""
| * || 52 || 52 || 33.4 || .501 || .355 || .746 || 3.6 || 4.1 || 1.0 || .2 || 16.2
|- align="center" bgcolor="#f0f0f0"
| * || 6 || 0 || 2.2 || .250 || .000 || .667 || 0.5 || 0.2 || .0 || .0 || 1.0
|- align="center" bgcolor=""
| * || 8 || 0 || 7.3 || .429 || .333 || 1.000 || 0.9 || 1.8 || .0 || .3 || 2.8
|- align="center" bgcolor="#f0f0f0"
|  || 41 || 2 || 13.0 || .393 || .293 || .735 || 1.8 || 1.1 || .4 || .2 || 5.6
|- align="center" bgcolor=""
|  || 74 || 4 || 19.5 || .416 || .354 || .825 || 2.5 || 1.2 || .6 || .2 || 11.9
|- align="center" bgcolor="#f0f0f0"
| * || 11 || 9 || 31.5 || .357 || .313 || .828 || 2.1 || 4.5 || .5 || .1 || 13.4
|- align="center" bgcolor=""
|  || 69 || 44 || 22.0 || .507 || .333 || .702 || style="background:#FF8800;color:#523189;"| 6.6 || 0.5 || .5 || style="background:#FF8800;color:#523189;"| 1.5 || 6.3
|- align="center" bgcolor="#f0f0f0"
|  || 6 || 0 || 6.0 || .273 || .500 || 1.000 || 0.5 || 0.3 || .5 || .2 || 1.5
|- align="center" bgcolor=""
|  || 81 || 35 || 25.2 || .434 || .358 || .628 || 4.8 || 1.6 || .8 || .2 || 10.4
|- align="center" bgcolor="#f0f0f0"
|  || style="background:#FF8800;color:#523189;"| 82 || style="background:#FF8800;color:#523189;"| 82 || 31.5 || .465 || .318 || .763 || 6.2 || 2.3 || 1.2 || .5 || 15.3
|- align="center" bgcolor=""
| * || 54 || 28 || 18.6 || .549 || . || .500 || 5.1 || 0.5 || .6 || 1.0 || 4.3
|- align="center" bgcolor="#f0f0f0"
| * || 5 || 0 || 8.8 || .214 || .000 || . || 0.6 || 1.2 || .0 || .0 || 1.2
|- align="center" bgcolor=""
| * || 16 || 0 || 6.3 || .240 || .000 || .500 || 1.6 || 0.2 || .3 || .1 || 1.1
|- align="center" bgcolor="#f0f0f0"
| * || 46 || 1 || 25.7 || .426 || style="background:#FF8800;color:#523189;"| .391 || style="background:#FF8800;color:#523189;"| .872 || 2.4 || 3.7 || 1.0 || .1 || 15.2
|- align="center" bgcolor=""
| * || 9 || 0 || 9.0 || .325 || .105 || .800 || 1.4 || 0.2 || .7 || .0 || 3.6
|- align="center" bgcolor="#f0f0f0"
| * || 24 || 0 || 11.3 || .351 || .387 || .667 || 1.8 || 0.4 || .2 || .0 || 3.3
|- align="center" bgcolor=""
|  || 78 || 63 || 30.6 || .438 || .345 || .727 || 6.4 || 1.6 || 1.4 || .3 || 9.1
|- align="center" bgcolor="#f0f0f0"
|  || 40 || 1 || 15.4 || .528 || .238 || .737 || 2.1 || 0.6 || .5 || .2 || 6.1
|- align="center" bgcolor=""
| * || 40 || 7 || 21.5 || style="background:#FF8800;color:#523189;"| .580 || .000 || .667 || 4.9 || 0.6 || .8 || 1.2 || 7.0
|}
* – Stats with the Suns.

Injuries/Personal games missed

Awards and records

Awards
T. J. Warren earned All-NBA Second Team Las Vegas Summer League Honors due to his performance in the 2014 NBA Summer League.
Isaiah Thomas was the runner-up for the NBA Sixth Man of the Year Award for his performances with both the Suns and the Boston Celtics.
Brandon Knight was considered a candidate for the NBA Most Improved Player Award for his performances with the Milwaukee Bucks and the Suns.

Week/Month

All-Star
Isaiah Thomas was announced as one of eight different participants to compete in the Taco Bell Skills Challenge during All-Star Weekend. His first opponent in the revamped competition was John Wall of the Washington Wizards. He'd end up being the shortest player to ever participate in the Taco Bell Skills Challenge. Thomas end up losing to the eventual champion Patrick Beverley (who replaced his initial first round opponent John Wall) in the first round.
Eventual Suns player Brandon Knight also lost to Beverley in the competition, only as the final opponent in the championship round.

Records
When the Suns traded Shavlik Randolph to the Boston Celtics and got Reggie Bullock from the Los Angeles Clippers, they were the only team in the league to not have any players go over the age of 30. The Suns continued with that line-up for around a month until acquiring 31-year-old Danny Granger in a multi-team trade and later signed the 33-year-old Earl Barron from the affiliate Bakersfield Jam (which was the first time the Suns called someone who initially came from the Jam D-League team to the Suns) to two 10 day contracts before signing back on for the rest of the season.
On the Suns' 117–113 overtime victory over Russell Westbrook and the Oklahoma City Thunder, Eric Bledsoe recorded 28 points on 11/16 shooting, 13 rebounds, 9 assists, 4 blocks, and 1 steal. Eric was the 9th player in NBA history to record similar kinds of statistics during the regular season, as well as the first point guard to record 50% shooting for 28 or more points while grabbing 13 or more rebounds, getting 9 or more assists, 4 or more blocks, and at least one steal in a game.
The Suns became the first (and so far, only) team in the history of the NBA to host a +43 and a -43 point differential in-between games this season, with them getting a -43 from their 117–113 overtime victory against the Oklahoma City Thunder to their brutal 101–74 loss to the defending champion San Antonio Spurs late in February, and then getting a +43 from going off of a close 74–72 victory over the New Orleans Pelicans at home to having a blowout 117–102 victory over the Houston Rockets on the road in March.

Team records
The Suns broke their season-opening record of three-point shots made in their opening game with 16 made three-pointers in their 119–99 victory against the Los Angeles Lakers on October 29, 2014. (Their previous record was 13 on Halloween day in 2006, which coincidentally was also against the Lakers.)
Isaiah Thomas' 23 points against the Lakers on October 29 was the most points a Suns player scored off the bench under their debut appearance with the team.
Isaiah Thomas' 200 points in 13 games was the most scored by a bench player since Tom Chambers during the 1992–93 season.
The two blowout road victories against the Philadelphia 76ers and Indiana Pacers on November 21 & 22, 2014 was the first time the Suns won back-to-back games on the road by 20 or more points since 2004.
Gerald Green's 24 games where he'd make at least one three-pointer (starting with that November 21, 2014 victory against the Philadelphia 76ers and ending on their January 6, 2015 victory against the Milwaukee Bucks) tied the Suns' highest mark with his former teammate Channing Frye getting at least one three-pointer going in for 24 straight games in the 2010–11 NBA season.
Starting on January 13, 2015 against the Cleveland Cavaliers, the Suns begin an 8-game homestand that was also the longest homestand in franchise history. With their victory over the Washington Wizards on January 28, the Suns were guaranteed to end their homestand with a winning record; they ended it with a 6–2 record.
With the Suns getting Seth Curry on March 11, 2015, they have officially had over 10% of their all-time roster representing relatives (fathers, sons, brothers, cousins, nephews, etc.) that had also played in either the NBA and/or the ABA at one point.
The 24 points the Suns scored in the first half of their 101–74 loss to the defending champion San Antonio Spurs on February 28, 2015 was the franchise's lowest scoring half ever. That record was broken a year later on January 3, 2016 against the Los Angeles Lakers with 22 points scored in the first half.
The Suns' 74–72 victory over the New Orleans Pelicans on March 19, 2015 tied the fewest points scored by the Suns in a victory (tying the record set on January 30, 1998 against the Miami Heat on the road with a 74–71 victory there), as well as set the fewest points scored in a victory for the team at a home game.
With the Suns having 23 different players getting playing time with the team at one point or another in the season, it tied the 1996–97 Phoenix Suns season for the most players to play at least one game with the Suns in a single season. That mark was matched once again next season, although for different reasons.

Milestones
With the Suns signing Zoran Dragić alongside his brother Goran Dragić, as well as extending both Markieff Morris and his twin brother Marcus Morris on September 29, 2014, this team marked the first time ever that different pairs of siblings/brothers played for the same team. All four players appeared for the first time in the same game under a November loss against the Los Angeles Clippers. Both pairs of brothers later made their first (and only) appearances together at the same time late in the fourth quarter and each produced numbers throughout the game in their January 2, 2015 112–96 victory against the Philadelphia 76ers.
When the Suns traded Shavlik Randolph for Reggie Bullock on January 15, 2015, the Suns made sure they had no players that were over the age of 30 on their roster. This marks one of the few, if only times where an NBA team had no one over the age of 30 signed onto their roster. It continued to be the case until the February 19, 2015 when the Suns got Danny Granger in a trade with the Miami Heat and later on got Earl Barron from the affiliate Bakersfield Jam (back) on the team in the process.

Team milestones
Goran Dragić surpassed forward Cedric Ceballos as the Suns' 28th best scorer of all time on the team near the start of the third quarter of the October 29, 2014 game against the Los Angeles Lakers. Goran scored 18 points as the Suns blew out the Lakers by the final score of 119–99.
Goran surpassed center James Edwards to become the Suns' 27th best all-time scorer near the start of the third quarter by making two free throws in the Halloween game against the defending champion San Antonio Spurs. Goran scored 10 points as the Suns kept it close and won by the score of 94–89.
Goran surpassed former Sixth Man of the Year small forward and current Suns broadcaster Eddie Johnson to become the Suns' 26th best all-time scorer near the end of the fourth quarter by scoring a critical layup during the last minute of the game. He scored 22 points in the November 17, 2014 game against the Boston Celtics as the Suns won a close one by the score of 118–114.
Goran Dragić surpassed Hall of Fame guard Dennis Johnson to become the Suns' 25th best all-time scorer with 7.6 seconds remaining in the fourth quarter by scoring a quick layup to end the 120–112 victory on the November 26, 2014 home game against the Denver Nuggets.
The Suns' 10–6 record was their best start to the season since the 2009–10 NBA season.
Goran surpassed point guard Kyle Macy early in the second quarter with a two-point shot as the Suns' 24th best all-time scorer on December 2, 2014 against the Indiana Pacers. He then surpassed point guard Stephon Marbury with less than a minute left in the second quarter with another two-point shot to become the Suns' 23rd best all-time scorer as he scored 22 points in the first half and a then-season high 34 points in a blowout 117–99 victory over Indiana at the US Airways Center.
Eric Bledsoe's first ever triple-double against his former team, the Los Angeles Clippers, in overtime on December 8, 2014 was the first time a Suns player recorded a triple-double since Boris Diaw back in April 14, 2006 against the Golden State Warriors.
Eric's second triple-double of his career on December 23, 2014 against the Dallas Mavericks was also the first time a Suns player had multiple triple-doubles in a season since Boris Diaw when he had four different triple-doubles in the 2005–06 NBA season.
Goran Dragić tied his former teammate Grant Hill with a two-point shot near the middle of the second quarter and then surpass him with a running lay-up in the middle of the second quarter to become the Suns' 22nd best all-time scorer on December 26, 2014 against the Sacramento Kings. He recorded 16 points as the Suns beat the short-handed Kings 115–106.
Goran tied point guard and former basketball coach Clem Haskins to become the Suns' 21st best all-time scorer near the end of the fourth quarter by making two free-throws to help the Suns increase their lead over the Los Angeles Lakers. Goran scored 24 points as the Suns decimated the Lakers 116-107 out at the Staples Center on December 28, 2014. He'd then surpass that total on December 30, 2014 with 8 minutes left in the first quarter against the New Orleans Pelicans at the Smoothie King Center in a close loss to them.
Goran surpassed future Hall of Famer point guard and current Milwaukee Bucks head coach Jason Kidd to become the Suns' 20th best all-time scorer near the beginning of the third quarter with a fast-break layup after a winning jump-ball in the Thunder's side of the field on New Year's Eve. He'd record 21 points in a close overtime loss against the Thunder.
When Eric Bledsoe had over 1,200 points, 400 rebounds, and 400 assists throughout this season, it made Eric the fifth Suns player to record such totals in a single season, with Jason Kidd (back in the 2000–01 NBA season), Jeff Hornacek (back in the 1991–92 NBA season), Alvan Adams (in his rookie season), and Gail Goodrich (back in the team's inaugural season) being the first to do so earlier.

Transactions

Trades

Free agents

Additions

Subtractions

References

External links
 2014–15 Phoenix Suns preseason at ESPN
 2014–15 Phoenix Suns regular season at ESPN

Phoenix Suns seasons
Phoenix